Kanwar Singh Chohan (born 30 January 1998) is an Indian cricketer. He made his List A debut for Odisha in the 2018–19 Vijay Hazare Trophy on 20 September 2018. He made his first-class debut on 20 February 2020, for Odisha in the quarter-finals of the 2019–20 Ranji Trophy.

References

External links
 

1998 births
Living people
Indian cricketers
Odisha cricketers
Place of birth missing (living people)